BNS Nabajatra is a Type 035G (Ming class) diesel electric submarine of the Bangladesh Navy. She is one of the first two submarines of the Bangladesh Navy.

Description
Nabajatra uses Chinese H/SQ2-262C active sonar (improved Pike Jaw MG-100 sonar), a Chinese copy of the French DUUX-5 passive sonar, integrated by an ES5F integrated sonar system. The boat uses MRK-50 Topol (Snoop Tray) surface search radar, a Magnavox satellite navigation system for communications, with a Type 921A electronics warfare suite.

Nabajatra has eight  torpedo tubes which can launch a complement of 14 heavy weight ET-31  anti-ship torpedoes and ET-40 anti-submarine torpedoes. ET-31 has a range of 15 kilometers with speed of 40 knots. ET-31 use active/passive acoustic homing guidance. ET-40  torpedo has two modes which can be launched from Model 7436
triple tube torpedo launching system. ET-40 has  30 kilometers range with speed of 25 knots or 18 kilometers range with speed of 42 knots. ET-40 use wire guidance (fire-and-forget) and active acoustic homing for ASW role. ET-40 also can used against surface ship while first stage is straight run (unguided) till passive acoustic homing mode (600m acquisition range) or wake homing guidance activated. Alternatively, the boat can carry up to 32 naval mines.

Service history

The ship was launched in 1989, serving the People's Liberation Army Navy Submarine Force from 1990 with pennant number 356. Before joining the Bangladesh Navy, the boat went through upgrade and refitting, extending its life to 2030. The upgrade included the installation of new sensors, modern computers  and communication systems. Interior decoration and crew comfort also improved.

The boat was handed over to the Bangladesh Navy on 14 November 2016. She reached Chattogram port, Bangladesh on 22 December 2016. She was commissioned to the Bangladesh Navy on 12 March 2017.

Gallery

See also

References

Ships built in Wuhan
Submarines of the Bangladesh Navy
Ming-class submarines
1989 ships